The Sultan Ismail Nasiruddin Shah Stadium is a multipurpose stadium in Kuala Terengganu, Terengganu, Malaysia. The stadium is named after the fourth Sultan of Terengganu. The stadium holds 15,000 capacity.

It is used mainly for football matches and serves as the home ground of Terengganu FC II, a feeder team of Terengganu FC.

History 
Sultan Ismail Nasiruddin Shah Stadium was officially opened by the Yang Maha Mulia Pemangku Raja Terengganu, Tengku Mahmud Ibni Sultan Ismail Nasaruddin Shah on 27 August 1967.

In 2008 after the completion of the Sultan Mizan Zainal Abidin Stadium, the stadium were going to be demolish by the Kuala Terengganu City Council (MBKT) to make way for a new development project of a recreational hub and multi-storey car park dubbed as “Dataran Kuala Terengganu”.

However, on 2 June 2009, the stadium demolition process were halted after the roof of Sultan Mizan Zainal Abidin Stadium collapse. By then the upper sections which expanded the original capacity of the stadium to 20,000 spectators had been taken down and the football pitch was in a bad state due to the heavy vehicles being driven on it. Due to the urgent state of affairs at that time, the stadium was quickly fixed and was restored to meet the minimum requirement of the Football Association of Malaysia (FAM) and Terengganu F.C. were spared from playing the home matches somewhere else but with a reduced capacity of just 15,000.

In May 2015, the Sultan Mizan Zainal Abidin Stadium was given the green light by FAM to hold competitive matches again after their competition committee members were satisfied with the repairs and upgrades carried out at the stadium. Terengganu FC returned to the Sultan Mizan Zainal Abidin Stadium while Terengganu FC II will continue to remain at the Sultan Ismail Nasiruddin Shah Stadium.

Overview 
The stadium was built in the city of Kuala Terengganu, Terengganu, Malaysia.

See also 
 Terengganu FC
 2013 Terengganu FA season

References

External links 

 Sultan Ismail Nasaruddin Shah Stadium at soccerway.com

Football venues in Malaysia
Athletics (track and field) venues in Malaysia
Multi-purpose stadiums in Malaysia
Sports venues in Terengganu
Terengganu FC
1967 establishments in Malaysia